Banki is a town and a Subdivision, Legislative Council constituency no. 88 and Notified Area Council in Cuttack district  in the state of Odisha, India. Banki is famous for the Charchika Temple, dedicated to the deity of Chamunda, the eight armed goddess and incarnation of Durga and for its scenic beauty. Current MLA Devi Ranjan Tripathy

Toponym
Banki is part of the original Bankigarh, the native king of Banki State. The word Banki is derived from Bakra Durg, as the fort of king of Banki is slightly round shaped, the Oriya word Bakra implying bend/round, was the source of origin. The name later used in folk Oriya as Banka Durg later misinterpreted as Banki from Banka.

History of Banki

Banki was a zamindari state in western part of Cuttack District.The Mahanadi River flowed on the northern part of the state. It was annexed in 1840 by the British. The population of Banki was 56,900 in 1881. The rulers of Banki bore the title Raja.

The king of Banki got married with  Rajkumari Sukadei of Badamba kingdom, the daughter of king of Badamba. The king of Khurda challenged Banki's king for a war. King of Banki was killed in the war and Sukadei got widowed. She vowed to take revenge from king of khurda for her husband's death. She took help of her brother, the prince of Badamba to win the war. She defeated the king of Khurda but did not kill him as she did not want the queen of Khurda to get widowed like her. Sukadei annexed some parts of Khurda with Banki and took the title Maharani.

After independence of our country  in 1947, Banki became a town.

Geography
It has an average elevation of 48 metres (157 feet). Banki is 58 kilometers away from the state capital of Bhubaneswar to the southeast, 47 kilometers from the district headquarters in Cuttack to the east, 35 kilometers away from Khurda in south, 45 kilometers away from Dhenkanal and 64 kilometers away from Nayagarh.

Climate
Banki has a tropical wet and dry climate according to Köppen classification system. Summer is hot as maximum temperature reaches 43 °C, winter is chilly and minimum temperature can drop around 9 °C. The rainy season is from June to September and the annual rainfall is between 75 and 150 cm. The average summer temperature is 40 °C and average winter temperature is 13 °C.

Neighbourhood
Banki is surrounded by many semi-urban villages which are the main source of local economy and trade needs as well as man-power.

Demographics
As of the 2011 India census, Banki had a population of 17,521. Males constitute 52%, of the population and females 48%. Banki has an average literacy rate of 82%, higher than the national average of 74.04%; with 55% of the males and 45% of females literate. 9.16% of the population is under 6 years of age.

Tourist attractions
Banki has many tourist attractions and places of worship, such as Charchika Temple, Anshupa Lake, Chandaka Elephant Sanctuary, Shri Mahima mani Temple of Ragadi, Shri Singhanatha Temple of Patapur, Arachandi Temple, Maa Bramhei Temple of Sahadapada Village, Sunadei Hill, Kalika Prasad, Devi Dwara of Gayal Bank, Bhagabat Goswami Temple Bilipada, Akhandeswar  the Lord Shiva temple (Harirajpur) and Maa Ratneswari temple  in Harirajpur village, Nilakantheswar Temple in Kuspangi village, Pandaba Bakhara Hill (Padanpur Village), Maha parbat Hill (Tulasipur) etc.

Culture
The Culture of Banki is very diverse as it is located on the banks of the Mahanadi River, which results in the popularity of the town itself.

Charchika Temple
Charchika Temple is one of the oldest Shakti places in India, is located here. This temple is situated on top of a small hillock Ruchika Parvata on the banks of the Renuka river. The Goddess is an eight-armed goddess Chamunda, also known as Maa Charchika Devi. She is seated on a prostrate human body and wearing a garland of human skulls. She displays khadga, shula, katari and varadamudra in her four right hands whereas the four left hands represent severed head, blood-cup, ‘’damru’’ and leaving a finger of the remaining hand soaked in blood. One more Temple of Maa Charchika is at Mathura, near the Yamuna river.

Cuisine
The cuisine of Banki includes popular dishes such as the Prasad of goddess Charchika (made of fish). Many residents are vegetarians, but non-vegetarian items such as chicken and mutton are preferred. Rice, lentils (locally referred to as dal), fish, prawns, meat and vegetables form the staple diet. There are also roadside dhabas that sell meat and vegetarian dishes. Sweets such as dahi boondi, rasagola, and chamcham are also prepared.

Handicrafts
Handicrafts called Chandua are made by the people, sarees and dresses being woven by women. Fishing is also a common practice and the collected fish is sold in local markets. The fishing industry in Banki is famous due to the illish, caught in the Mahanadi River by the fishermen.

Educational Institutions
The prominent educational institutions in Banki town and near it are

Primary and Upper Primary
 Charchika Nodal U.P. M.E. School
Kuspangi M. E. School, Kuspangi
Kuspangi Primary School, Kuspangi,
Padanpur Nodal Primary Bidyalaya, Padanpur
Anuary U.P.ME School, Anuary
Baragan Project UP School
Singhnathpur U.G.ME School, Patapur
Tulasipur U.G.M.E. SCHOOL, TULASIPUR

High school
 Barendra Krushna Bidyapitha, Banki
 Government Girls High School, Banki
 MAHABERANA BIDYAPITHA, Pathuripada
 Shri Singhanath Dev Bidyapitha, Patapur
 Sri Aurobinda Centre For Integral Education, Banki
 Similipur Harirajpur Anchalika Bidyapitha, Harirajpur
 Talabasta High School, Talabasta
 Raghunath Debata Bidyapitha, Brahmapura
uttar kulatha bidyapitha bandalo
Maa durga girls highschool bandalo
Kusunda High School, Kusunda
Kuspangi High School, Kuspangi
Manamohan bidya pitha, Andharua, Banki
Gayal Bank High School, Gayal Bank
Charchika UP UGME School, Banki
Saraswati Sishu Vidya Mandir, Banki.
BN BIDYAPITHA, PADANPUR
BG BIDYAPITHA, BILIPADA
TULASIPUR HIGH SCHOOL, TULASIPUR

College
 Banki Autonomous College, Banki
 Rani Sukadei women's College, Banki
 Dompada degree college, Dompada
 Anshupa degree college, Saranda
 Baideswar junior mahavidyalaya, Baideswar
 Kalapathar Dhalapathar regional degree college, Kalapathar

Training Institute
 Govt. Secondary Training Institute, Ragadi, Banki

Politics
Current MLA from Banki Assembly Constituency is Devi Ranjan Tripathy, who represented the party of Biju Janata Dal in the state elections of 2019 . Previous MLA from this seat were Pravat Tripathy who won this seat in 2014, 2009 and 2000 representing BJD and in 1995 representing JD, Debasis Patnaik in 2004 who representing INC, Ghanasyam Sahoo of JD in 1990, Akshay Kumar Patnaik representing INC in 1985 and representing INC(I) in 1980, and Dr. Jogesh Chandra Rout of INC in 1977.

Banki is part of Cuttack Lok Sabha constituency.

Politics of Banki N.A.C.
Banki N.A.C. is the most prominent part of Banki subdivision as consisting of Banki town market and area around it mainly Sahadapada, Patapur, Gopalpur, Dangipita, Charchika, Srichandanpur, Ranapur, Khamarang, Bedapur, Sisua & Chakapada villages. It is divided into 17 wards. The chairman is elected within the wardmember/councilors of these wards. Current Chairman of Banki NAC is Shrimati Manika Sahu of Biju Janata Dal.

Religion

The main religion practised in Banki is Hinduism. Other religions are Islam and Christianity.

1. Hinduism  96.86%
2. Islam 2.4%
3. Christianity 1.10%
4. Buddhist 0.5%

References

External links
 A website on Banki, Orissa
 An Website of Common Service Centre "Subhashree Internet World, Banki"

Cities and towns in Cuttack district